Lista negra (English title:Black list) is a Mexican telenovela produced by Francisco Burillo for Televisa in 1986. It is an original story by Carlos Enrique Taboada and directed by Julio Castillo.

Eduardo Palomo and Luz María Jerez starred as protagonists, while Enrique Rocha starred as main antagonist.

Plot
Hugo Lauri is a reporter investigating the murder of a woman while traveling aboard the luxury yacht "Ulysses". Ten years earlier, the yacht left Puerto Vallarta, full of rich passengers. The maiden voyage of "Ulysses" was intended to start a business of tours with yacht passengers as potential customers. However, the tranquility of the trip ended when Nora Capelli, a girl on board crashed into the sea and drowned.

Although the circumstances of his death were shrouded in mystery, the police closed the case and filed it as a tragic accident. Now, Hugo is determined to clarify the case. However, several wealthy and influential people start dying, and Hugo discovers that all these people were passing on board the "Ulysses".

Cast 
Eduardo Palomo as Hugo Lauri
Luz María Jerez as Violeta
Enrique Rocha as Daniel
Magda Guzmán as Angélica
Juan Antonio Edwards as Simón
Tony Carbajal as Pablo
Lilia Michel as Leonora
Rolando de Castro as Octavio
Gerardo Murguía  
Emma Teresa Armendáriz as Doña Trini
Jorge Mateos as Don Joaquín
Claudia Ramírez as Nora Capelli
Héctor Sáez as César
Edith González as Mary
Jorge Fink as Chano
Miguel Priego as Ricardo
Mauricio Davison as Teodoro
Karla Lárraga as Blanca
Cristina Peñalver as Mercedes
Gilberto Macín 
Javier Ernez
Pedro Zavala as Agustín Roel

Awards

References

External links

1986 telenovelas
Mexican telenovelas
1986 Mexican television series debuts
1986 Mexican television series endings
Spanish-language telenovelas
Television shows set in Mexico
Televisa telenovelas